Events from the year 1659 in France.

Incumbents 
Monarch: Louis XIV

Events
 21 May – France, the Commonwealth of England, and the Dutch Republic sign the Concert of The Hague.
 7 November – Treaty of Pyrenees: French King Louis XIV and King Philip IV of Spain agree to French acquisition of Roussillon and 
 The Spanish Infanta Maria Theresa brings cocoa to Paris.
 Parisian police raid a monastery, sending monks to prison for eating meat and drinking wine during Lent.

Births
 

 
 4 March – Pierre Lepautre (1659–1744), French artist (d. 1744)
 8 March – Isaac de Beausobre, French Protestant pastor (d. 1738)
 22 June – Simon-Pierre Denys de Bonaventure, French officer and governor of Acadia (d. 1711)
 18 July – Hyacinthe Rigaud, French painter (d. 1743)
 Charles Ancillon, French Protestant pastor (d. 1715)

Deaths
 

 
 16 January – Charles Annibal Fabrot, French lawyer (b. 1580)
 17 February – Abel Servien, French diplomat (b. 1593)
 8 October – Jean de Quen, French Jesuit missionary and historian (b. c. 1603)

See also

References

1650s in France